Peter Joseph Simone (born 1945) is an American organized crime figure from Kansas City, Missouri who is thought to be involved in running illegal gambling activities.

In April 1992, Simone was convicted of money laundering in a video poker scam and sentenced to four years' imprisonment. Simone was released on probation in 1996 and placed on three years' probation. In May 1997, Simone was listed in the Missouri Gaming Commission "Black Book", which bars undesirables from entering Missouri casinos.

On January 2, 1999, only two months before the end of his probation period, Simone was caught playing craps at Harrah's North Kansas City Hotel & Casino. Although sentenced to spend one day in jail, Simone's probation period was extended 12 months with four months of electronically monitored house arrest. Later in 1999, Simone violated probation again as Federal Bureau of Investigation (FBI) agents observed him at a strip club for over three hours. This time, Simone went back to prison.

On February 29, 2000, Simone was released from federal custody. He is thought by the FBI to be the underboss of the Kansas City crime family.

References

Further reading
United States. Congress. Senate. Committee on Governmental Affairs. Permanent Subcommittee on Investigations. Organized Crime and Use of Violence: hearings before the Permanent Subcommittee on Investigations. 1980. *
Federal Bureau of Prisons Locator Website 

1938 births
Living people
Kansas City crime family
American money launderers
American gangsters of Italian descent